Strictispira stillmani is a species of small sea snail, a marine gastropod mollusk in the family Pseudomelatomidae, the turrids and allies.

Description
The length of the shell attains 14 mm.

Distribution
This marine species occurs off Pacific Panama.

References

 Shasky, D.R. (1971) Ten new species of tropical Eastern Pacific Turridae. The Veliger, 14, 67–72, 1 pl.

External links
 
 Gastropods.com: Strictispira stillmani

stillmani
Gastropods described in 1971